The Certificate of Secondary Education (CSE) was a subject-specific qualification family awarded in both academic and vocational fields in England, Wales and Northern Ireland. CSE examinations were held in the years 1965 to 1987. This qualification should not be confused with the Indian Certificate of Secondary Education which is the school leaving qualification in India. Also, in some African and former British colonial countries (such as, Kenya) there is a qualification named the Certificate of Secondary Education based on the original and former British variant. Also, the CSE should not be confused with the African qualification CSEE (Certificate of Secondary Education Examination).

CSE
The 1960 Beloe Report was commissioned to look into a new exam which became the CSE.

The CSE was introduced to provide a set of qualifications available to a broader range of schoolchildren and distinct from the GCE (O-Levels), that were aimed at the academically more able pupils, mostly those at grammar and independent schools (rather than secondary modern schools). CSEs were available in both academic and vocational subjects, incorporated controlled assessment in addition to examination, and examination questions were typically offered in a shorter and more structured form than those found on an equivalent O-Level paper.

Before the introduction of the CSE, the majority of schoolchildren at secondary modern schools did not take externally set end of school examinations, and so left school without any nationally recognised qualifications. Though the introduction of the CSE did not, of itself, resolve the issue as the majority still left at the end of the fourth year without sitting an external qualification. By the late 1960s and early 1970s, some counties had introduced their own examinable qualifications for those leaving at the end of the fourth year. For example, the county of Monmouthshire in Wales awarded the Monmouthshire Certificate in Education.

The majority of secondary modern pupils continued to leave without qualifications until the raising of the school leaving age to 16, in 1973, made a fifth year of secondary education compulsory.

A number of GCE and CSE exam boards experimented with offering a combined O-Level and CSE examination, in the 1970s, for borderline candidates. The papers contained questions limited to areas of the syllabus that were common to both an O-Level and CSE.
 
The range of courses for CSE was wider than that for the O-level and included many vocational subjects, such as car maintenance, which were not available at O-level. As comprehensive schools gradually replaced secondary modern schools, pupils could increasingly take a mixture of CSEs and O-levels until finally the examinations were merged with the new GCSE certification courses.

CSEs and O-levels are the predecessor examinations of the General Certificate of Secondary Education (GCSE).

Grading
There were five pass grades in its grading system ranging from grades 1 to 5. A CSE grade 1 was equivalent to achieving an O level grade of C or higher, in the same subject, while a 4 was obtainable by someone of average / median ability. Gaining a CSE Grade 1 implied that the student could have followed an O level course in that subject. This often caused frustration for such pupils wishing to progress to A-level, who (due to incompatibilities in the syllabi) would need to take a 1-year O-level conversion course in the Lower Sixth and thus waste a year gaining a qualification they theoretically already held.

Though no formal requirements existed, grades 2 to 3 were possibly set to be equivalent to the two (D and E) lowest O-Level pass grades.

Entrants
The 1978 Waddell Report, when comparing O-Level and CSE entrants stated: "the O Level examination tending to be aimed at the upper 20 per cent of the full ability range and CSE catering for the next 40 per cent", is partially supported by the statistics. For subjects where an equivalent O-level paper existed approximately 36% of the pupils entered for either exam, after 1976, sat the O-Level, the remainder (64%) sat the CSE paper. The proportion taking CSE exams increased following the raising of the minimum school leaving age to 16, in 1973, and the subsequent fall in the proportion sitting neither exam e.g.

Exam Boards
The CSE syllabi, examinations and awards were originally made by 15 independent regional boards:

 Associated Lancashire Schools Examining Board
 East Anglian Examinations Board
 East Midland Regional Examinations Board
 Metropolitan Regional Examination Board
 Middlesex Regional Examination Board
 Northern Ireland Schools Examination Council
 North Regional Examinations Board
 North West Regional Examinations Board
 South-East Regional Examinations Board
 South Western Examinations Board
 Southern Regional Examination Board
 Welsh Joint Education Committee
 West Midlands Regional Examination Board
 The West Yorkshire and Lindsey Regional Examining Board
 Yorkshire Regional Examinations Board

In 1979, the neighbouring Metropolitan and Middlesex boards merged to form the London Regional Examinations Board. The West Yorkshire and Lindsey and Yorkshire and Humberside boards also merged to form the Yorkshire and Humberside Regional Examinations Board in 1982.

Unlike GCE and GCSE examinations, the participating schools did not have a choice of awarding body, but were required to use the designated local board. Unlike the GCE and GCSE boards, the CSE exam boards were composed of elected teachers and local authority representatives from each region.

See also
 GCE Ordinary Level (International) (O-Level)
 GCE Ordinary Level (United Kingdom)
 Ordinary Level (Sri Lanka)
 Cambridge International Ordinary Level (Singapore)
 Cambridge International O-Level subjects
 General Certificate of Secondary Education (GCSE), which replaced the O Levels and CSE
 International General Certificate of Secondary Education (IGCSE), which is offered with or instead of O Levels internationally
 General Certificate of Education (GCE), which comprises O Levels and A-levels
 School certificate (SC), predecessor to the GCS O-Level and CSE qualifications
 School Certificate (United Kingdom)
 School Certificate (Australia) 
 School Certificate (New Zealand)

Notes

Educational qualifications in England
Secondary school qualifications
Secondary education in England
Secondary education in Wales
Secondary education in Northern Ireland
Educational qualifications in Wales
Educational qualifications in Northern Ireland